Ainoa is a shopping centre located in Tapiola, Espoo, Finland. Its first phase was opened on 24 October 2013 in a 1979 building that housed the Tapiola Sokos department house until 2011. During the renovation, the building was extended both upwards and downwards.

Ainoa has five floors and about 100 shops, such as K-supermarket, Little Bouquet Factory, Stockmann, Alko, H&M, Clas Ohlson, Cubus, Stadium, BR-Lelut and Kultajousi.

The parking hall in connection with Ainoa has approximately 450 parking spaces. Ainoa has good bus connections to other parts of Espoo and the neighbouring city of Helsinki. Ainoa is accessible from the Helsinki Metro through the Länsimetro extension. In the future Ainoa will have a central parking hall with approximately 2000 parking spaces.

External links
 

Shopping centres in Espoo
Tapiola